Qinghuayuan railway station was a railway station in Beijing.

History

The construction work of the station was completed in 1910. The station was located near the east gate of Tsinghua University. In early 1950s, the old station moved to its new location, about 0.5 kilometers south to the former station. The new station was located south to 4th Ring Road, just east to the later built elevated Beijing Subway line 13.

The station was named after Tsinghua Garden.

It was closed on November 1, 2016.

Schedules

28 passenger trains stopped at the station before it ceased operation:

Schedule updated on Jul. 1st, 2015.
Note: Trains with the number 7xxxx have been cancelled due to the opening of Line S2.

References

Stations on the Beijing–Baotou Railway
Railway stations in Haidian District
Railway stations in China opened in 1910
Railway stations closed in 2016